The Oboe Concerto No. 2 in B flat major (HWV 302a) was composed by George Frideric Handel for oboe, orchestra and basso continuo. It was first published in the fourth volume of Select Harmony by Walsh in 1740. Other catalogues of Handel's music have referred to the work as HG xxi, 91; and HHA iv/12,47.

The concerto borrows extensively from the overtures to the Chandos Anthems O come, let us sing unto the Lord (HWV 249b) and I will magnify thee (HWV 250a)—which were combined and transposed for the work. It has been suggested that the work was arranged by Handel for the Dutch oboist Jean Christian Kytch.

A typical performance of the work takes almost nine minutes.

Movements
The work consists of four movements:

See also
 Handel's concertos

References

Concertos by George Frideric Handel
Handel 2
Compositions in B-flat major
1740 compositions